Winston Foster , better known by the stage name Yellowman, is a Jamaican reggae and dancehall deejay, also known as King Yellowman. He first became popular in Jamaica in the 1980s, rising to prominence with a series of singles that established his reputation.

Career

Winston Foster was abandoned by his parents and grew up in the Maxfield Children's Home and the Catholic orphanage Alpha Boys School in Kingston, the latter known for its musical alumni. He was shunned due to having albinism, which was not typically socially accepted in Jamaica. In the late 1970s Yellowman first gained wide attention when he finished second to Nadine Sutherland in the 1978 Tastee Talent Contest. Like many Jamaican deejays, he honed his talents by frequently performing at outdoor sound-system dances, prominently with Aces International. He had success as a recording artist, working with producer Henry "Junjo" Lawes. In 1981, after becoming popular throughout Jamaica, Yellowman became the first dancehall artist to be signed to a major American label (Columbia Records). 

His first album release was in 1982 entitled Mister Yellowman followed by Zungguzungguguzungguzeng in 1983 earning instant success. Yellowman's sexually explicit lyrics in popular songs such as "Mad Over Me", boasting, like other reggae singers/deejays, of his sexual prowess, earned Yellowman criticism in the mid-1980s. Yellowman appeared in Jamaican Dancehall Volcano Hi-power 1983 which featured other major dancehall musicians such as Massive Dread, Josey Wales, Burro Banton and Eek-A-Mouse.

Yellowman proclaimed, "I never know why they call it slackness. I talk about sex, but it's just what happens behind closed doors. What I talk is reality."

He had success in 1987 with a version of "Blueberry Hill", that topped the charts for several weeks in Jamaica. Yellowman had met Fats Domino when the American performed on the island earlier in the decade, and Domino had presented him with a copy of his version. 

By the mid-1990s, Yellowman released socially conscious material, rising to international fame along with singers such as Buju Banton. Yellowman became the island's most popular deejay. During the early 1980s, Yellowman had over 40 singles and produced up to five albums per year.

He re-invented himself with his 1994 album Prayer, which stepped away from the slackness that gave him his initial fame. His latest albums are New York (2003), Round 1 (2005), and No More War (2019). Yellowman was also a featured guest vocalist on the Run-DMC track "Roots Rap Reggae". Yellowman continues to perform internationally with his Sagittarius Band, and has toured through places such as Nigeria where he retains a following of fans, as well as Spain, Peru, Sweden, Italy, Germany, Britain, France, Kenya, the United States and Canada. He also featured on OPM's 2004 album, Forthemasses.

In 2018, it was announced that he would be awarded the Order of Distinction (Officer Class) by the Jamaican government.

Personal life
Foster's daughter Kareema followed him into a career in music.

Philosophy
He has spoken against violence. In the Montreal Mirror in 2005 he said, "Now it's not your entertainment or teaching. If you notice the hip hop and dancehall artists today, all they do they sing about drugs, clothes, car, house—when they can't get it, they start get violent. I know what violence is like and what it contain and what it can do. I'm glad that the roots is coming back." The slackness style with which Yellowman is associated sometimes has homophobic lyrics. However, in the same Montreal Mirror article he spoke against it: "Everybody listen to me... I don't do songs against gay people, I don't do violent lyric against gay people. If you don't like a person or you don't like a thing, you don't talk about it. You don't come on stage and say kill them or burn them because everybody have a right to live."

Cancer
In 1982, Yellowman was diagnosed with skin cancer. After several surgeries, Yellowman was able to continue his career. The cancer went into apparent remission during this time. In 1986 it was diagnosed that the cancer had spread to his jaw; Yellowman underwent very invasive jaw surgery to remove a malignant tumor. This surgery permanently disfigured Yellowman's face, as a large portion of the left side of his lower jaw had to be removed to successfully remove the tumor.

"Zungguzungguguzungguzeng"
The instrumental for Yellowman's 1982 "Zungguzungguguzungguzeng", the "Diseases" riddim by "Junjo" Lawes, has been sampled and imitated repeatedly since its original release. The original version of this riddim was performed by Alton Ellis for a song called "Mad, Mad, Mad" produced by Coxsone Dodd in 1967. Coxsone Dodd had already released two dub cuts, "Talking Dub" and "Lusaka", plus a 1980 cut by Jennifer Lara, "Hurt So Good." This riddim came to be known as the 'Diseases' riddim after Michigan and Smiley recorded their song, Diseases, with Henry Junjo Lawes in 1981. 

"Zungguzungguguzungguzeng" was remade by Beenie Man and released on 3 July 2020. Yellowman said of the release, "I wish somebody else did do Zungguzungguguzungguzeng, maybe Shaggy or Sean Paul….Me nuh even hear it."

The vocal melody of "Zungguzungguguzungguzeng" has also been sampled heavily in various reggae and hip hop songs.

Timeline:

Bonehead, "Zungguzungguguzungguzeng" (see also, Live at Aces version, w/ Fathead) (1982)
Sister Nancy, "Coward of the Country" (1982)
Frankie Paul, "Alesha" (1984)
Toyan, "Hot Bubble Gum" (1984)
Cocoa Tea, "I Lost My Sonia" (1985)
Super Cat, "Boops" (1985)
BDP, "Remix For P Is Free" (1987)
BDP, "Tcha Tcha" (1988)
Nice & Smooth, "Nice & Smooth" (1989)
Nice & Smooth, "Dope on a Rope" (1989)
K7, "Zunga Zeng" (1993)
KRS-One, "P Is Still Free" (1993)
Us3, "I Got It Goin' On" (1993)
Buju Banton, "Big It Up" (1993)
Ninjaman, "Funeral Again" (1994)
Bounty Killer, "Kill Or Be Killed" (1994)
Sublime, "Greatest Hits" (1994)  
Just My Imagination w/Sista Sensi (2013)
Frosty the Dopeman w/Sista Sensi
Buju Banton, "Man a Look Yu" (1995)
Junior M.A.F.I.A. (feat. The Notorious B.I.G.), "Player's Anthem" (1995)
Sublime, "Roots of Creation" (1995)
2Pac, "Hit 'Em Up" (1996)
Black Star, "Definition" (1998)
Mr. Notty, "Sentencia de Muerte" (1998)
Dead Prez, "It's Bigger than Hip-Hop" (2000)
Beenie Man, featuring Wyclef Jean, "Love Me Now" (2000)
Nejo, track 14 (DJ Joe's Fatal Fantasy 1)(2001)
Joe Budden, "Pump It Up" (2003)
Tego Calderón, "Bonsai" (2003)
Jin, "Learn Chinese" (2004)
Vybz Kartel, "Tight Pussy Gyal" (2004)
P.O.D., featuring Matisyahu, "Roots in Stereo" (2006)
White Rappers, "One Night Stand" (2007)

Discography

Studio albums

Live albums

Compilations

Videos

References

External links
 Yellowman official website
 

People with albinism
Jamaican dancehall musicians
Jamaican male singers
Jamaican songwriters
1956 births
Living people
People from Westmoreland Parish
Jamaican reggae singers
Columbia Records artists
VP Records artists
Greensleeves Records artists